Elamine "Amin" Erbate, also known as Amin Erbati, (born 1 July 1981) is a Moroccan footballer. He played as a defender.

He was part of the Moroccan 2004 Olympic football team, who exited in the first round, finishing third in group D, behind group winners Iraq and runners-up Costa Rica.

He signed with French side Olympique Marseille in May 2008.

In December 2008, he signed with UAE side Al-Wahda FC.

In December 2010, he signes with Raja de Casablanca.

References

1981 births
Living people
Moroccan footballers
Moroccan expatriate footballers
Morocco international footballers
Olympic footballers of Morocco
Footballers at the 2004 Summer Olympics
2006 Africa Cup of Nations players
2008 Africa Cup of Nations players
Raja CA players
Olympique de Marseille players
Qatar SC players
Al Dhafra FC players
Al Wahda FC players
Moroccan expatriate sportspeople in France
Expatriate footballers in France
Moroccan expatriate sportspeople in Qatar
Expatriate footballers in Qatar
Moroccan expatriate sportspeople in the United Arab Emirates
Expatriate footballers in the United Arab Emirates
Ligue 1 players
Moghreb Tétouan players
AC Arlésien players
People from Fnideq
Association football defenders
UAE Pro League players
Qatar Stars League players